Sunday Coffie Mbang  is a Nigerian, Patriarch/Prelate of Methodist Church Nigeria, President, World Methodist Council and National President, Christian Association of Nigeria.

Early life
Sunday Mbang was born in Idua Eket, Eket Local Government Area of Akwa Ibom State of the Federal Republic of Nigeria on 26 August 1936. He was born into very humble and Christian family.

Education 
Sunday Mbang studied in the Effoi Group School, Salvation Army School, Akai-Ubium, Government School, Eket, Methodist Boys’ High School, Oron, Teacher's College, Uzuakoli, Trinity Theological College, Umuahia, University of Ibadan, Hebrew University of Jerusalem, Israel and Harvard University, USA.

Ministry 
Sunday became a minister in 1961.  He went through theological education and training in Nigeria and overseas. He became a Pastor and Minister of Religion in 1962 in Methodist Church Nigeria and rose through the ranks to be elected into the Episcopal rank, Bishop of Tinubu, Lagos State in 1979 and later was elevated to the position of Patriarch/Prelate, the administrative and pastoral head and leader of the entire Methodist Church family in Nigeria in 1984, a position he held for twenty-two years. For many of his working years as teacher, evangelist and pastor, he held a number of positions outside that of Methodist Church Nigeria, namely; the  National President of the Christian Association of Nigeria. The co-chairman of the Nigeria Inter-Religious Council, and the Vice and Chairperson of the World Methodist Council for many years.

Awards and recognition
World Methodist Council Peace Award
Commander of the Order of Niger (CON)
Honorary Doctor of Divinity from Baptist Seminary, Ogbomosho, Oyo State
Honorary Doctor of Divinity from the University of Nigeria Nsukka, Nsukka, Enugu State

References

External links
Life And Times of Prelate  Sunday Mbang
Governor Sanwo-olu attends 85th birthday celebration of His Eminence, Dr. Sunday Mbang, the prelate emeritus of the Methodist Church of Nigeria on Sunday, August 29, 2021

University of Ibadan alumni
Hebrew University of Jerusalem alumni
Harvard Divinity School alumni